"" (Ah! Deceiver), Op. 65, is a concert aria for soprano and orchestra by Ludwig van Beethoven. The dramatic scena begins with a recitative in C major, taken from Pietro Metastasio's Achille in Sciro. The aria "Per pietà, non dirmi addio" (For pity's sake, do not bid me farewell) is set in the key of E-flat major, and its lyricist is anonymous. A performance takes about 14 minutes.

History
The singer, a friend of Mozart in Prague, advertised it as "an Italian scena written by Beethoven for  Duschek", possibly to raise interest rather than a statement about a dedication. The only extant manuscript by a copyist has a dedication to "Signora Comtessa di Clari", Countess Josephine of Clary-Aldringen.

Another notable performance occurred in 1808 as part of a benefit concert for the composer on 22 December which also featured the premieres of his fifth and sixth symphonies, an excerpt of his Mass in C major, among others. The singer was the 17-year old  who stepped in on short notice after others cancelled. A sister-in-law of the violinist Ignaz Schuppanzigh, she possibly performed, to mixed reaction, from the manuscript which shows changes made by Beethoven. This version differs from the first edition, which causes a problem for editors as both versions are authorized by Beethoven.

In 1819, Hofmeister in Leipzig printed it and assigned number 46. The number 65, which Beethoven had for unknown reasons not used, was assigned to the piece in 1819 by Artaria in Vienna, when Beethoven's Piano Sonata Op. 106 was published with a works list. In chronological order, a number in the range 5 to 10 would be justified.

Text

Ah! Faithless one, perjured,
barbarous betrayer, do you leave?
And are these your last farewells?
Who ever suffered such cruel tyranny?
Go, wicked man! Go, run from me,
The wrath of the Gods you shall not escape!
If there is justice in Heaven, if there is mercy,
They will join together to punish you!
Pursuing shade, present wherever you go,
I shall see my vengeance;
I already enjoy it in my mind;
I see already lightning flashing about you.
Ah no, ah no, stop, Gods of vengeance!
Spare that heart, strike mine!
Though he has changed, I am what I was,
Through him I lived, I would die for him!

For pity, do not bid me farewell,
What shall I do without you?
You know, fair beloved,
I shall die troubled.

Ah, cruel one, you would that I die!
Have you no pity for me?
Why do you treat one who adores you
With such barbarous reward?
Tell me if in such trouble
Am I not worthy of pity?

References 
Notes

Sources

External links 
 
 
 
 Beethoven's "Ah! perfido", programme note by Donald Teeters, Boston Cecilia, 2004
  – Birgit Nilsson; Wolfgang Sawallisch, Orchestra della RAI di Roma (1974)

Compositions by Ludwig van Beethoven
Music dedicated to nobility or royalty
1796 compositions
Soprano arias
Arias in Italian